Charles Magnus Lindgren (November 28, 1819 - September 1, 1879) was a Swedish born, American shipping executive. He was a pioneer in the Great Lakes shipping industry.

Background
Charles Magnus Lindgren was born near Dragsmark in Uddevalla Municipality in the traditional Province of Bohuslän, in Västra Götaland County, Sweden. He went to sea at the age of 14.  In 1849, he went to the California gold fields where he engaged in the freight traffic.

Career
In 1852, Lindgren entered into a railway project together with the Bishop Hill Colony and settled in 1854 in Henry County, Illinois, a few miles from Galva. In 1856, Lindgren came to Chicago, bought a couple of freight vessels and contracted with a lumber company for shipping lumber from Michigan to Chicago.

In 1860 he engaged in shipping. He gradually added vessel after vessel until in 1870 he owned half a dozen ships with a combined tonnage of 4,500. Several of these were among the largest in the Great Lake  trade at that time. In 1871, he had three more large freighters built at Manitowoc, Wisconsin. One of these, the schooner  Christina Nilsson was named after Christina Nilsson, a world-renowned Swedish diva who had visited America that year.

Personal life
In 1852, Lindgren returned to Sweden to marry Johanna Andersson. They subsequently returned to America arriving in Chicago. Lindgren was a philanthropic man who was particularly liberal toward the Swedish Methodist Church. When the Swedish Methodist Theological Seminary in Chicago (now Garrett-Evangelical Theological Seminary) was founded, Lindgren contributed generously toward its erection and maintenance. Charles Lindgren was the father of John R. Lindgren, founder of the Haugan & Lindgren bank in Chicago.

References

Other sources
Henschen, Henry S. A History of The State Bank of Chicago From 1879 to 1904 (Chicago: The Lakeside Press. 1905)
 Benson, Adolph B.; Naboth Hedin Swedes In America (New York: Haskel House Publishers. 1969)

External links
Christina Nilsson Photo Gallery
Christina Nilsson Maritime Trails 

1819 births
1879 deaths
People from Uddevalla Municipality
Businesspeople from Evanston, Illinois
Businesspeople from Chicago
Swedish emigrants to the United States
American businesspeople in shipping
19th-century American businesspeople